This is a list of the 30 longest governing ministers-president of Germany since 1945 by time in office.

Germany, Minister-Presidents
Minister-Presidents, longest governing
German Ministers-President